We Are Time is a compilation album by English post-punk band The Pop Group. It was released on 13 June 1980 through the record labels Rough Trade and Y.

Track listing

Personnel 
Adapted from the We Are Time liner notes.

The Pop Group
 Dan Catsis – bass guitar (A5, B2)
 Gareth Sager – saxophone, clarinet, piano, organ, guitar
 Bruce Smith – drums, percussion
 Mark Stewart – vocals
 Simon Underwood – bass guitar (A1-A4, B1, B3-B5)
 John Waddington – guitar

Additional musicians
 Mark Springer – piano and vocals (B3)

Technical
George Peckham – mastering

Charts

Release history

References

External links 
 
 We Are Time at Bandcamp

1980 compilation albums
The Pop Group albums
Rough Trade Records compilation albums